Cecelia Felgueras (born 6 January 1962) is an Argentine politician. She was the comptroller of PAMI during the Presidency of Fernando de la Rúa but would lose the position because of prosecution over alleged corruption. She was then briefly the Deputy Chief of Government of Buenos Aires in Aníbal Ibarra's first term, but was removed from this position as well. She was the first woman to hold that position. She has a degree in history.

Career
On 15 December 1999, she was named President of PAMI by President Fernando de la Rúa. The next year, she and other former PAMI heads Horacio Rodríguez Larreta and Daniel Tonietto before a court because of a complaint from the Argentine Federation of Chambers of Pharmacy (FACAF) accusing the three politicians of favoritism towards Farmacéuticos Argentinos SA (FASA) for the acquisition of influenza vaccines. Also among the complaints was an accusation that PAMI paid the FASA an unregistered sum of 150,000 pesos.

In 2000, Felgueras became the first woman to head the government of the City of Buenos Aires with her election on 17 August. The next month, she met and greeted Abdullah of Saudi Arabia, the King of Saudi Arabia, and gave him the keys to the city. Felgueras's friendship with Ibarra collapsed on 24 January 2001. He criticized the city's lax response to a storm that had recently struck the city, in whose aftermath only a few members of the city's leadership arrived for their jobs.

Citations

Living people
1962 births
Politicians from Buenos Aires
21st-century Argentine women politicians
21st-century Argentine politicians
Argentine people of Spanish descent
Radical Civic Union politicians